The Shire of Yalgoo is a local government area in the Mid West region of Western Australia, about  north of the state capital, Perth.

History
The original Yalgoo Road District was gazetted on 3 July 1896, and abolished and divided between the Mount Magnet Road District and Upper Irwin Road District on 11 August 1911.

The Shire of Yalgoo originates from the establishment of the second Yalgoo Road District on 19 April 1912, which was formed out of parts of the Mount Magnet, Upper Irwin and Murchison road boards. On 1 July 1961, it became the Shire of Yalgoo under the Local Government Act 1960, which reformed all remaining road districts into shires.

Wards
The Shire is no longer divided into wards and the seven councillors sit at large.

Towns and localities
The towns and localities of the Shire of Yalgoo with population and size figures based on the most recent Australian census:

Pastoral station names associated with  Yalgoo
Note that some of these stations may lie outside of the local government boundary.

 Barnong
 Bunnawarra
 Carlaminda
 Dalgaranga
 Edah
 Gabyon
 Jingemarra
 Maranalgo
 Meka
 Melangata
 Mellenbye
 Mount Gibson
 Muralgarra
 Nalbarra
 Ninghan
 Noongal
 Oudabunna
 Thundelarra
 Wagga Wagga
 Wydgee

Notable councillors
 Frank Wallace, Yalgoo Roads Board chairman 1896–1897; later a state MP

Heritage-listed places

As of 2023, 42 places are heritage-listed in the Shire of Yalgoo, of which eleven are on the State Register of Heritage Places.

See also
 Yalgoo bioregion – the ecological region

References

External links
 

 
Yalgoo